Empress Dowager Duan is the name of:

 Empress Dowager Duan (Zhaowen), mother of Murong Xi, emperor of Later Yan
 Empress Dowager Duan (Murong Chao), mother of Murong Chao, emperor of Southern Yan